Judith Rose Balaban (born 1932) is an American actress and author who wrote the book The Bridesmaids: Grace Kelly and Six Intimate Friends about Grace Kelly. Balaban was a friend of Grace Kelly, through her marriage to Jay Kanter, and served as a bridesmaid in her wedding to Rainier III, Prince of Monaco, in April 1956.

Biography
Balaban was born to a Jewish family in Chicago, Illinois, the daughter of Tillie (née Urkov) and Barney Balaban. Her brothers are American jazz tubist and sousaphonist, Leonard "Red" Balaban and American film producer and director Burt Balaban. Balaban wrote The Bridesmaids: Grace Kelly and Six Intimate Friends. She appeared in the Showtime documentary ‘Becoming Cary Grant'.

Balaban has been married three times. In the early 1950s she dated actor, Montgomery Clift.  In 1953, she married Grace Kelly's talent agent Jay Kanter; they had two daughters, Victoria Kanter and Amy Kanter, before divorcing in 1961. In 1961, she married actor Tony Franciosa; they had one daughter, Nina Franciosa, before divorcing in 1967. In 1971, she married actor Don Quine; they divorced in 1996.

References

External links
 

1932 births
20th-century American actresses
American women non-fiction writers
Jewish American actresses
Living people
Balaban family
20th-century American women writers
20th-century American non-fiction writers
Actresses from Chicago
Writers from Chicago
21st-century American Jews
21st-century American women